Un amore may refer to:
 Un amore (1965 film), a film starring Rossano Brazzi 
 Un amore (1999 film), a film starring Fabrizio Gifuni 
 Un amore (novel), a novel by Dino Buzzati